Crazy Waiting, also known as The Longest 24 Months or Going Crazy Waiting, is a 2008 South Korean film written and directed by Ryu Seung-jin.

Plot
In South Korea, all men in their early twenties have to serve two years of mandatory military service, and many young couples find themselves asking, "Do we stay together…or break up?" If they stay together, will their love survive the two-year separation? The movies look at four couples as they explore these questions and "go crazy while waiting" to be reunited with their lovers.

Hyo-jeong is dating the much-younger Won-jae when he leaves for military service, and his visits home put a strain on her wallet. Bo-ram has a crush on bandmate Min-cheol, who ignores her in favor of Han-na. Jin-ah and Eun-seok are the perfect, cutesy couple, but telling his best friend to take care of her turns out to be Eun-seok's mistake. High school student Bi-ang's reaction to live-in boyfriend Heo Wook's departure is to go out and find a replacement - innocent college student Ho Sin.

Cast
Son Tae-young ... Kim Hyo-jeong
Jang Keun-suk ... Park Won-jae
Jang Hee-jin ... Nam Bo-ram
Danny Ahn ... Seo Min-cheol 
Yoo In-young ... Kang Jin-ah
Kim San-ho ... Jeong Eun-seok
Han Yeo-reum ... Jo Bi-ang
Woo Seung-min ... Heo Wook
Seo Min-woo ... Ho Sin
Lee Young-jin ... Han-na
Kim Tae-hyun ... Jae-hyun

References

External links
 https://web.archive.org/web/20090907062608/http://www.crazy4wait.co.kr/ 
 
 
 
 Crazy for Wait at Naver 

2008 films
South Korean romantic comedy films
2008 romantic comedy films
2000s South Korean films
2000s Korean-language films